The Col Saint-Antoine, or Saint-Antoine Pass, is a mountain pass in the Haute-Corse department of Corsica, France.
It is one of the main passes in the island of Corsica.

Location and topography

The Col Saint-Antoine is located in the Monte San Petrone massif, a chain of medium-sized schist mountains in the northeast of the island, north of the Castagniccia region. 
Col Saint-Antoine provides a passage through steep valleys from Casacconi in the lower valley of the Golo river in the north-west to Ampugnani in the east.

To the south is the Fontanelle ravine in which there is an unnamed stream that feeds the Ruisseau de Molaghina, a tributary of the Ruisseau de Pozzo Bianco, in turn a tributary of the Fium'Alto river.

Geology

The site is in "Eastern Alpine Corsica". 
It is formed here by the strongly displaced terrain of Castagniccia, composed of lustrous schists and ophiolites that form the eastern reliefs of the island.

Weather
The pass is rarely snow covered in winter; it is practicable all year round. 
The strong westerly winds which prevail further north on the Cap Corse range are hardly felt.

Flora and fauna

The pass was frequented ten years ago in October by hunters of migrating wood pigeons.

The site is located in the heart of “petite Castagniccia”, an area covered with arborescent vegetation dominated by chestnut trees, most often  in the form of orchards or coppices, with holm oaks.

Access
Col Saint-Antoine is at the crossroads of the roads:
D15, which connects Volpajola to the pass itself;
D515, which connects Barchetta on RT 20 (ex-RN 193) to La Porta and beyond to Nocario;
D237, which connects the pass to Torra-Vescovato on the RT 10 (ex-RN 198).

History

The ruins of the former  are in the pass.
This is a historic landmark for the Corsican nation, listed as a Historic Monument.
Numerous national consultations (or assemblies) were held there. 
At one on 15 July 1755 Pasquale Paoli was proclaimed general of the kingdom of Corsica.

Notes

Sources

Mountain passes of Haute-Corse